Ernst Detlof von Krassow, Swedish noble and military commander, born around 1660, dead 23 January 1714, freiherr (1707). Appointed Major General in 1706. Father of Karl Vilhelm von Krassow.  As a colonel, he was an important leader in the cavalry assault in the Battle of Fraustadt in the Great Northern War resulting in the rout of the Saxon cavalry, and the double envelopment of the Saxon main element.

References
 

1660 births
1714 deaths
Swedish generals
Caroleans